Pedro Medrano (26 April 1769 – 3 November 1840) was a Uruguayan-born Argentine statesman and lawyer. He was a representative to the Congress of Tucumán which on 9 July 1816 declared the Independence of Argentina.

Medrano was born in San Fernando de Maldonado in Uruguay. He studied in Buenos Aires and at the Colegio Montserrat de Córdoba and gained his doctorate in law at the University of Charcas, becoming known as a brilliant orator. In 1810 he was appointed an oidor of the Real Audiencia. That same year he participated in the May Revolution at the Cabildo Abierto. He was one of the authors of the 1815 provisional statute of Argentina.
He was elected by Buenos Aires to the Tucumán Congress in 1816 for the declaration, serving as the first president of the Congress and giving the inaugural speech.

Medrano was secretary of the provincial junta of representatives in 1821 and a deputy on two occasions. He served as fiscal (state attorney) from 1838 and president of the Chamber of Appeals. He was a friend and ally of Juan Manuel de Rosas.

Medrano, Pedro
Medrano, Pedro
Members of the Congress of Tucumán
19th-century Argentine lawyers
Uruguayan emigrants to Argentina
People from Maldonado, Uruguay
People of the Argentine War of Independence
University of Charcas alumni